Ram Asur is a 2021 Indian Telugu-language sci-fi drama film film written and directed by Venkatesh Triparna. This film is produced under the banners ASP Media House and GV Ideas by Abhinav Sardhar and Venkatesh Triparna.  It stars Abhinav Sardhar, Ram Karthik, Chandini Tamilarasan, Sherry Agarwal while Suman and Subhalekha Sudhakar play important roles. The music is composed by Bheems Ceciroleo and cinematography by J. Prabhakara Reddy.  Ram Asur was released theatrically on 19 November 2021.

Plot
Ram (Ram Karthik) tries to artificially generate a diamond. No matter how much he tries, he fails in his sincere attempts. His girlfriend Priya (Sherry Agarwal) decides to dump him for a reason. With the aim of limping back in life, he meets an astrologer Ramachari (Shubhalekha Sudhakar) who advises him to meet one Suri (Abhinav Sardhar). Now, Suri comes with an unconventional past. How Ram's tryst with this unusual man unfolds and the repercussions of their coming together is the rest of the story.

Cast
Abhinav Sardhar as Suri
Ram Karthik as Ram 
Chandini Tamilarasan as Chandini
Sherry Agarwal as Priya 
Suman as Balaramaraju
Subhalekha Sudhakar as Ramachari
Shaani Salmon as Shiva

Soundtrack

Music composed by Bheems Ceciroleo

References

External links

Films shot in Telangana
2021 directorial debut films
Films scored by Bheems Ceciroleo
Indian science fiction drama films
2021 science fiction films
2020s Telugu-language films
Films shot in Hyderabad, India